Peacefrog Records is a British independent record label based in London, England. The label produces releases in many different styles of electronic music, as well as branching out into folk and indie artists such as José González, Nouvelle Vague and Little Dragon. The label was started by Pete Hutchison and Paul Ballard in 1991. After the Lodger 303 EP, Ballard withdrew from Peacefrog Records. The record label subsequently released a number of techno records, by artists including Luke Slater, Moodymann and Suburban Knight.

The label has built up a following over the years, increased by the mainstream success of José González and has become synonymous for synching many of its recently signed artists music to film and television. Notable examples of this include the 2006 Sony Bravia "Balls" (José González) and in 2011, Twinings "Sea" (Charlene Soraia). Both artists enjoyed top 10 single success as a consequence. José González's album, Veneer, was certified platinum in 2006 and Charlene Soraia's "Wherever You Will Go", was certified gold in 2012 with sales in excess of 500,000. Other artists signed to the label who have enjoyed commercial success include Nouvelle Vague, who achieved sales of over one million worldwide over the three albums recorded for the label. Peacefrog is also an active and successful music publishing company.

Past and present musicians 

 Alton Miller
 Anthony Nicholson
 Aril Brikha
 Charlene Soraia
 Charles Webster
 Chris Brann (Wamdue Project)
 Daniel Bell
 Dan Curtin
 Jello
 David Alvarado
 Ellis Island Sound
 Findlay Brown
 Gemini
 Glenn Underground
 Ian O'Brien
 Jessica 6
 Joe Lewis
 John Beltran
 José González
 Kenny Larkin
 Klima
 Little Dragon
 Lucien - N - Luciano
 Luke Slater
 Marc Hellner (Pulseprogramming)
 Marco Passarani
 Marissa Nadler
 Mark Tinley
 Max Brennan
 Mined
 Moodymann
 Neil Landstrumm
 Norma Jean Bell
 Nouvelle Vague
Parekh & Singh
 Paul Johnson
 Readymade FC
 Recloose
 Robert Hood
 Ron Trent
 Roy Davis Jr.
 Stasis
 Suburban Knight
 The Beauty Room
 The Detroit Escalator Co.
 The Memory Band
 Theo Parrish
 Underground Evolution

See also 
 List of record labels

External links 

British independent record labels
House music record labels
Record labels based in London
World music record labels
Folk record labels
Electronic music record labels
Psychedelic trance record labels
Pop record labels
Easy listening record labels
Smooth jazz record labels
Soundtrack record labels
Hip hop record labels
Electronic dance music record labels
Experimental music record labels